The 1955 Victorian state election was held in the Australian state of Victoria on Saturday 28 May 1955 to elect 65 (of the 66) members of the state's Legislative Assembly.

The incumbent Labor Party Government was defeated by the Liberal and Country Party (LCP) led by Henry Bolte with a swing of 14.6%.

Background
John Cain had led the Labor Party in Victoria since 1937, and had been Premier since defeating John McDonald's Country Party government at the 1952 election, forming the first majority Labor government in Victoria's history.

The leader of the opposition Liberal and Country Party, Trevor Oldham, had died on 2 May 1953 in a plane crash on his way to attend the coronation of Queen Elizabeth II. Oldham's deputy, Henry Bolte, succeeded him a few days later.

The election was triggered by events related to the Australian Labor Party split of 1955, in which followers of B. A. Santamaria's "Movement"—Catholic, anti-Communist, right-aligned members of the Labor Party—were accused by federal leader H. V. Evatt of contributing to his loss of the 1954 federal election to Robert Menzies. The federal executive set about expelling "disloyal" members who supported the Movement.

In the Victorian parliament, the anti-Communists were known as the Barry–Coleman group after the leaders of the faction: Bill Barry in the Legislative Assembly and Les Coleman in the Legislative Council. In April 1955, Barry and Coleman wrote to Cain requesting a unity conference, but the request was rejected, with Cain telling the group that they could only achieve unity within the ALP, by accepting the authority of the Labor federal conference and executive, and the Victorian central executive.

On the night of 19 April, Bolte moved a motion of no-confidence against Cain's government in the Legislative Assembly. In the early hours of 20 April, following a twelve-hour debate, eleven anti-Communist Labor members crossed the floor to support Bolte's motion. With his government defeated, Cain sought and received a dissolution of parliament later that day.

Key dates

Results

Legislative Assembly

|}

Notes:
The seat of Gippsland South was retained uncontested by Sir Herbert Hyland for the Country Party. Figures for enrolled voters and ballots cast are for contested seats only.
The Victorian Liberal Party contested the previous election as the Electoral Reform League. The party was formed by a group of disaffected former Liberal and Country Party members who followed Thomas Hollway when he was expelled from the L&CP.

See also
Candidates of the 1955 Victorian state election
1955 Victorian Legislative Council election
Members of the Victorian Legislative Assembly, 1955–1958
Members of the Victorian Legislative Council, 1955–1958

References

1955 elections in Australia
Elections in Victoria (Australia)
1955 in Victoria (Australia)
May 1955 events in Australia